Eleven ships of the British Royal Navy have borne the name HMS Hector, named after the Trojan hero Hector in the Iliad.

 The first  was a 22-gun ship sold in 1656.
 The second  was a 30-gun ship sold in 1657.
 The third  was a 22-gun ship sunk by the Dutch Navy in 1665. 
 The fourth  was a 44-gun fourth rate launched in 1703 and broken up in 1742.
 The fifth  was another 44-gun fourth rate sold in 1762.
 The sixth  was cutter purchased in 1763 and sold in 1773.
 The seventh  was a 74-gun third rate launched at Deptford in 1774 and converted to a prison ship in 1808. 
 The eighth  was a 74-gun third rate  captured from France in April 1782 that foundered in October.
 The ninth  was the first ship of her class of iron steam propelled battleships and launched in 1862, and scrapped in 1905.
 The tenth  was a requisitioned merchant ship used as a kite balloon ship in the Dardanelles campaign (1915), and returned to civil service in 1918.
 The eleventh  was an armed merchant cruiser that served in World War II and was damaged beyond repair by Japanese aircraft in 1942.

Royal Navy ship names